Lay-Saint-Remy Aerodrome,  was a temporary World War I airfield in France.  It was located  West-Northwest of the commune of Lay-Saint-Remy, in the Meurthe-et-Moselle department in north-eastern France.

Overview
The airfield was built at the end of the summer of 1918 and allocated to the Second Army Air Service for combat operations during a planned drive against Metz in the fall. The first unit to reach the field was 138th Aero Squadron - ready to be part of the newly formed 5th Pursuit Group, but as a result of the 11 November armistice, it did not see any combat operations. Subsequently, the HQ and the two other squadrons (41st and 638th) of the 5th Pursuit Group arrived on 14–15 November, flying non-combat operations from the field.

From Lay-Saint-Remy, the squadrons moved to Coblenz Airdrome, Fort Kaiser Alexander, in April 1919, as part of the Third Army of Occupation, and the aerodrome was turned over to the French Government, to be returned to agricultural use.

The map, taken from Gorrell's papers, shows that the airfield was located on the plateau west of Lay Saint Remy.

Known units assigned
 5th Pursuit Group HQ, 15 November 1918 - 15 April 1919
 138th Aero Squadron (Pursuit), 5 November 1918 - 15 April 1919 
 41st Aero Squadron (Pursuit) 15 November 1918 - 15 April 1919
 638th Aero Squadron (Pursuit), 14–30 November 1918 - 15 April 1919

See also

 List of Air Service American Expeditionary Force aerodromes in France

References

 Series "D", Volume 2, Squadron histories,. Gorrell's History of the American Expeditionary Forces Air Service, 1917–1919, National Archives, Washington, D.C.

External links

World War I sites of the United States
World War I airfields in France